The willow flute, also known as sallow flute (or sälgpipa,  or pajupilli), is a Nordic folk flute, or whistle, consisting of a simple tube with a transverse fipple mouthpiece and no finger holes.  The mouthpiece is typically constructed by inserting a grooved plug into one end of the tube, and cutting an edged opening in the tube a short distance away from the plug.

Similar but not identical instruments were made by peasants in Poland, usually using a different method described in sources as "kręcenie" (that nowadays means literally "rolling", at that time possibly also "drilling-gouging"), "ukręcanie", "ulinianie" (nowadays literally meaning: "making moulted"). Such instruments are mentioned in folk poems or songs.

The willow flute is a type of overtone flute.  It is played by varying the force of the air blown into the mouthpiece, with the end of the tube being covered by the finger or left open.  The tones produced are based on the harmonic series.  Playing the instrument with the end of the tube covered produces one fundamental and its overtones, playing it with the end of the tube left open produces another fundamental and series of overtones.  Willow flutes cannot play an equal tempered scale.

Modern willow flutes are typically made of plastic (PVC tubing is often used), but the original willow flutes were made from sections of bark cut from green willow branches.  Willow flutes could only be made this way during the spring, and became unplayable when the bark dried out.

Noted modern willow flute artists include the group Hedningarna and Anders Norudde of Sweden. Other Nordic groups that use the Seljefløyte in traditional arrangements include Eivind Groven, Steinar Ofsdal, Lillebjørn Nilsen, Groupa, Bask, Ruumen, Ojajärvi Blom Ojajärvi and Tapani Varis Collective.

There is also a Karelian variant of the willow flute that is made in Finnish Karelia and the Russian Republic of Karelia. It is made the same way as the willow flute, but instead of willow bark, it is made out of birch bark. The Karelian Folk Music Ensemble, based out of Petrozavodsk in Russian Karelia, uses this instrument in their music.

See also
 Fujara, an overtone-based folk flute from Slovakia
 Koncovka, another Slovakian overtone-based folk flute
Naturskalaen, Eivind Groven's short book on why he believed that the willow flute's scale was the basis of Norwegian folk music phrasing.
 The Celtic Lyre. The Preface explains why the willow flute and natural instruments like it may have been the originators of Gaelic song melodies.
 www.overtoneflute.fi/home Self-study material for playing willow flute

References

Finnish musical instruments
Internal fipple flutes
Overtone flutes
Nordic folk music
Sámi musical instruments
Swedish musical instruments